Atteva fabriciella, the Ailanthus webworm moth, is a moth of the family Attevidae. It is found in China, India and Sri Lanka. It is considered one of deadliest plant pest on Ailanthus species.

Reproduction
Females are nocturnal, remained concealed during the day. Small pale green eggs are laid either as single or small groups, usually on young buds and tender leaves. Incubation lasts from 2–3 days according to the season, and emerge 1st instar larva. There are five larval instars, where the larval period may be 13–20 days. Fifth matured larva constructs a loose cocoon and pupates. Color of the pupa changes from orange brown to pale yellow brown. The pupal stage completes after 4–14 days.

References

External links
A review of the New World Atteva (Walker) moths (Yponomeutidae, Attevinae)

Insects of China
Insects of India
Arthropods of Sri Lanka
Moths described in 1787
Attevidae